This article is about Hull F.C. rugby league football club's 2021 season.
During the season, they competed in Super League XXVI and the 2021 Challenge Cup.

Super League

  

All fixtures are subject to change

League table

Challenge Cup

2021 squad

2021 transfers

Gains

Losses

References

External links

 

Hull F.C. seasons
Super League XXVI by club